Uday Suresh Kotak (born 15 March 1959) is an Indian billionaire banker and the executive vice chairman and managing director of Kotak Mahindra Bank.

In the early 1980s, while India was still a closed economy and economic growth was muted, Kotak decided to start out on his own, refusing a lucrative job option from a multinational. Over the next few years, he diversified his business into various areas of financial services, establishing a prominent presence in bills discounting, stockbroking, investment banking, car finance, life insurance and mutual funds. On 22 March 2003, Kotak Mahindra Finance Ltd. became the first company in India’s corporate history to receive a banking license from Reserve Bank of India.

Bloomberg Billionaires Index estimated his wealth to be US$14.8 billion as of April 2021. In 2006 he and Goldman Sachs ended their 14 year partnership when Goldman Sachs sold their 25% stake in two subsidiaries for $72 million to Mr. Kotak.

Early life and education 
Kotak was raised in an upper middle class Gujarati joint-family  household with 60 people sharing a common kitchen under one roof. The family was originally into combine trading. He called this "Capitalism at work and Socialism at home". His two pastimes had been cricket and playing the sitar. In a 2014 interview with NDTV, he admitted that he was no longer pursuing his playing of the sitar. His talent in mathematics influenced his choice of career. He earned a bachelor's degree from Sydenham College and completed a postgraduate degree in management studies in 1982 from Jamnalal Bajaj Institute of Management Studies.

Career 
After completing his MBA, Kotak started Kotak Capital Management Finance Ltd (which later became Kotak Mahindra Finance Ltd). From a seed capital of less than US$80,000 borrowed from family and friends, he converted a bill-discounting start-up into a financial services conglomerate with assets of US$19 billion (as of March 2014), and the second largest schedule commercial bank by market capitalization in India (private and PSU) with over 1250 branches.

During 2014, Kotak almost doubled his wealth as shares of his Kotak Mahindra Bank hit an all-time high after he sealed a $2.4 billion deal in November 2014 for rival ING Vysya Bank, partly owned by Dutch financial services group ING.

In 2015, Kotak enters the general insurance business and is partnering telecom magnate Sunil Mittal's Bharti Airtel to start a small payments bank.

Kotak has reduced his stake in the Kotak Mahindra Bank to 30% as of now, as he is required to bring it down to 20% as per RBI directions.

He took over as President of the Confederation of Indian Industry (CII) for the year 2020-21.

Honours and awards 
 In June 2014, he was named Ernst & Young World Entrepreneur Of The Year.
In 2015 he won the 'Business Leader of the Year Award' by Economic Times
 He was the sole Indian Financier to feature in Money Masters: The Most Powerful People in The Financial World, by Forbes magazine, US (May 2016)
 India Today magazine ranked him #8th in India's 50 most powerful people of 2017 list.
In 2018, he won the USIBC Global Leadership Award

Memberships 
Kotak is a member of the Government of India's High Level Committee on Financing Infrastructure, the Primary Market Advisory Committee of the Securities & Exchange Board of India, Member of the Board of Governors of the National Institute of Securities Markets and ICRIER. He is also Governing Member of the Mahindra United World College of India, and Member of National Council of CII. Kotak is also a member of the strategic board which advises the national law firm, Cyril Amarchand Mangaldas.

Personal life
He is married to Pallavi Kotak, has two children and lives in Mumbai.

References

External links
 Kotak Family Office

Indian billionaires
1959 births
Living people
Jamnalal Bajaj Institute of Management Studies alumni
Businesspeople from Mumbai
University of Mumbai alumni
Gujarati people
Kotak Mahindra Bank